A national without household registration (NWOHR) is a person with Republic of China nationality who does not have household registration in Taiwan. Nationals with this status are subject to immigration controls when entering the Taiwan Area, do not have automatic residence rights there, cannot vote in Taiwanese elections, and are exempt from conscription. Most individuals with this status are children born overseas to Taiwanese citizens. About 60,000 NWOHRs currently hold Taiwanese passports with this status.

Terminology 
Although NWOHR status only has one Chinese-language name, the Ministry of Justice has used several English translations. These include: "nationals without registered permanent residence in the Taiwan Area", "non-citizen ROC nationals", "unregistered nationals", "Overseas Chinese having not established household registration in the Republic of China", and "people without nationalities in Taiwan". The Taipei Times occasionally uses "nationals without citizenship".

Background 

The Republic of China (ROC) governed mainland China from 1912 to 1949. The islands of Taiwan and Penghu were ceded to the Empire of Japan in 1895 by Qing China, the last ruling dynastic Chinese regime, following its defeat in the First Sino-Japanese War. Control of these islands was transferred to the ROC in 1945 after the Second World War. Near the end of the Chinese Civil War, the Nationalist government was forced to retreat to Taiwan by the Communist Party, which subsequently established the People's Republic of China (PRC) in 1949. Since the conclusion of the war, the ROC has controlled only the Taiwan Area.

The ROC continues to constitutionally claim areas under PRC control (mainland China, Hong Kong, and Macau) as part of its territory. Because of this, Taiwan treats residents of those areas as ROC nationals. Additionally, because Taiwanese nationality law operates under the principle of jus sanguinis, overseas Chinese and Taiwanese are also regarded as nationals. During the Cold War, both the ROC and PRC governments actively sought the support of overseas Chinese communities in their attempts to secure the position as the legitimate sole government of China. The ROC also encouraged overseas Chinese businessmen to settle in Taiwan to facilitate economic development. Regulations concerning evidence of ROC nationality by descent were particularly lax during this period, allowing many overseas Chinese the right to settle in Taiwan.

From the late 1980s, Taiwan developed a stronger sense of local national identity and more readily asserted its separate identity from that of China. Legal reforms between 1999 and 2002 greatly reduced the ease by which further grants of ROC nationality were made to overseas Chinese and restricted citizenship rights only to those with household registration in Taiwan. Full citizenship rights, including permanent residence and voting, can only be exercised by nationals who have been registered. NWOHRs are now treated as an external population to Taiwan.

Nationals of Mongolia, which was part of Qing China until 1911, were also regarded as if they were mainland Chinese residents until 2002, when the Mainland Affairs Council removed the country from the administrative definition of the Mainland Area. Since then, Mongolians have been treated as foreigners and are required to apply for visas before entering Taiwan. Nevertheless, the area of Outer Mongolia remains officially part of ROC territorial claims.

Among the NWOHRs living in Taiwan, many of them are ethnic Chinese from the Philippines descended from ROC nationals. A significant portion also come from Myanmar and Thailand, where Republic of China Army detachments fled to after the Chinese Civil War. Descendants of these soldiers entered Taiwan on forged or stolen passports, often to enroll in universities. Because they were not considered nationals of the countries they traveled from, they could not be deported. 875 of these descendants and 107 members of the Tibetan diaspora were granted amnesty in 2009, allowing them to apply for residency.

Acquisition and loss 

Legislation governing Republic of China nationality applies to an extremely broad group of people. All persons of ethnic Chinese and Taiwanese origin, regardless if they have resided overseas for an extended period of time, are technically ROC nationals. Consequently, children born overseas to any of these people automatically acquire ROC nationality at birth. Furthermore, because of Taiwan's continuing claims over areas controlled by the People's Republic of China, PRC nationals from mainland China, Hong Kong, and Macau are also considered ROC nationals. Because only nationals born in ROC-controlled areas are automatically given household registration, any person claiming ROC nationality by descent or through connection with PRC-controlled areas would be an NWOHR. Foreigners who acquire ROC nationality do not acquire household registration as part of the naturalization process and are also NWOHRs until they register for permanent settlement in Taiwan.

Requirements for acquiring documentation from the Taiwanese government certifying NWOHR status for non-naturalized nationals differ depending on which region of Greater China applicants originate from, whether they or their parents have ever held an ROC passport, and if they have registered as overseas Chinese at a Taiwanese diplomatic mission. Children born overseas to nationals already holding ROC passports are subject to no additional requirements other than providing sufficient proof of a parent's nationality. More than 30 million people are estimated to be eligible to claim passports through nationality by descent.

Individuals from mainland China, Hong Kong, and Macau who do not also possess household registration in Taiwan are generally ineligible for passports and must obtain specific approval from the Ministry of Foreign Affairs to be granted exceptions. However, Hong Kong and Macau residents who had established overseas Chinese status before the end of colonial rule are exempt from this requirement and continue to be regarded as if they were other overseas Chinese. Residents originating from PRC-controlled areas who currently live overseas and have lived there for more than four years with established permanent residence may be issued passports if: they have been married to Taiwan Area persons for more than two years, or have children; and have special skills in their professional fields, or made extraordinary contributions to Taiwan. Mainland Area persons must additionally surrender their Chinese passports. Hong Kong and Macau residents are ineligible if they possess foreign travel documents, except for British National (Overseas) passports and Portuguese passports originally acquired before Macau's transfer in 1999. Residents from these areas may also be granted passports if they are invited to represent Taiwan in international competitions or under special discretionary circumstances, and if they currently live either in Taiwan or overseas.

NWOHRs may voluntarily relinquish the status by application to the Ministry of the Interior, provided that they have acquired another nationality or are married to foreign nationals. The status may be deprived if it was fraudulently acquired. All Taiwanese nationals, including NWOHRs, who obtain hukou in mainland China automatically have their passports cancelled and any residence rights in Taiwan revoked.

Entry requirements 

Although NWOHRs may travel using a Taiwanese passport, because the status by itself does not give its holders residence rights in Taiwan, they face restrictions when traveling there and are not treated identically to Taiwanese nationals with household registration when entering other countries. For example, visa waivers for holders of Taiwanese passports traveling into the Schengen Area only apply to those with household registration.

Taiwan 

Nationals without household registration are subject to immigration controls and do not have automatic residence or employment rights in Taiwan. They may not enter ROC-controlled areas with only their NWOHR passports. NWOHRs must also present an endorsement letter from an Overseas Community Affairs Council certifying their residency overseas, a Certificate of Alien Registration from South Korea indicating their long-term or permanent residence status there, or an entry permit from the National Immigration Agency. They may also enter Taiwan with an Exit & Entry Permit without having to present a passport. Each visit is restricted to three months, which may be extended once per visit for a further three months.

NWOHRs given approval to reside in Taiwan are restricted from rights and benefits reserved for full Taiwanese citizens. They are not entitled to hold national identification cards and are given Taiwan Area Resident Certificates instead. The lack of household registration makes them ineligible for national health insurance and automatic workers' compensation coverage. They cannot vote in elections or stand for public office. NWOHRs who concurrently hold foreign nationality are additionally required to apply for work permits to be employed in Taiwan.

Obtaining household registration 
NWOHRs may request approval to reside in Taiwan for employment, study, investment, or family reunion. They may obtain household registration after residence for a number of years, which grants full citizenship rights in Taiwan. NWOHRs born to Taiwan Area persons may be registered after continuous residence for one year, 270 days per year for two years, or 183 days per year for five years. Mainland Area persons are subject to annual immigration quotas limiting the number of people acquiring residence permits and household registration each year. An NWOHR who enters Taiwan with a foreign passport or travel document for stateless people may not apply for residency, unless that person is an NWOHR by naturalization or descent through birth overseas to a Taiwan Area person. All NWOHRs who successfully obtain household registration continue to be exempt from conscription until one year after the day they are registered.

China, Hong Kong, and Macau 

Because NWOHRs do not have national identification cards, they cannot follow the standard procedure that allow Taiwan residents to travel to mainland China, Hong Kong, and Macau. They must use Chinese Travel Documents instead of their passports when traveling to these places.

References

Citations

Sources

Publications

Legislation 

 
 
 
 
 
 
 
 
 
 
 
 

Taiwanese nationality law